Je Seong-tae (born 28 September 1975) is a South Korean sports shooter. He competed in the men's 10 metre air rifle event at the 2004 Summer Olympics.

References

External links
 

1975 births
Living people
South Korean male sport shooters
Olympic shooters of South Korea
Shooters at the 2004 Summer Olympics
Place of birth missing (living people)